National Highway 965C, commonly referred to as NH 965C, is a national highway in  India. It is a spur road of National Highway 65. NH-965C traverses the state of Maharashtra in India.

Route 

Pandharpur, Shetphal, Kurudwadi.

Junctions  
 
  Terminal near Pandharpur.
  near Shetphal.
  Terminal near Kurudwadi.

See also 

 List of National Highways in India
 List of National Highways in India by state

References

External links 

 NH 965C on OpenStreetMap

National highways in India
National Highways in Maharashtra